Mudassar Asghar (born 18 October 1947) is a Pakistani field hockey player. He competed at the 1972 Summer Olympics and the 1976 Summer Olympics, winning a silver and bronze medal respectively.

References

External links
 

1947 births
Living people
Pakistani male field hockey players
Olympic field hockey players of Pakistan
Field hockey players at the 1972 Summer Olympics
Field hockey players at the 1976 Summer Olympics
Olympic silver medalists for Pakistan
Olympic bronze medalists for Pakistan
Olympic medalists in field hockey
Medalists at the 1972 Summer Olympics
Medalists at the 1976 Summer Olympics
Place of birth missing (living people)
20th-century Pakistani people